Nakagawara Station is the name of two train stations in Japan:

 Nakagawara Station (Mie) (中川原駅)
 Nakagawara Station (Tokyo) (中河原駅)